Frank Kramer may refer to:

 Frank Louis Kramer (1880–1958), American cyclist
 Frank Kramer (artist) (1905–1993), American artist and illustrator
 Frank Kramer (footballer, born 1947) (1949–2020), Dutch footballer and television presenter for SC Telstar
 Frank Kramer (footballer, born 1972), German football player and coach
 Gianfranco Parolini or Frank Kramer (1925–2018), Italian film director